Summer Evening was a Canadian music variety television series which aired on CBC Television in 1976.

Premise
This series was produced through CBC Ottawa as a series of concert recordings from the CBC Summer Festival at Camp Fortune in Quebec. Episodes featured performances from such artists as Liam Clancy, Shirley Eikhard, Kevin Gillis, Eric and Martha Nagler, Ron Nigrini, Sneezy Waters and Robin Moir.

Scheduling
This half-hour series was broadcast on Thursdays at 9:00 p.m. from 12 August to 30 September 1976.

References

External links
 

CBC Television original programming
1976 Canadian television series debuts
1976 Canadian television series endings
1970s Canadian music television series